Alonzo Longware (March 27, 1891 - March 30, 1961) was a Negro leagues third baseman at the founding of the first Negro National League. He started the 1920 season playing for the Indianapolis ABCs and was traded during the first week of May to the Detroit Stars.

References

External links
 and Seamheads

Indianapolis ABCs players
Detroit Stars players
1891 births
1961 deaths
Baseball players from Shreveport, Louisiana
Baseball players from Los Angeles
Baseball third basemen
20th-century African-American sportspeople